Haiti has 27 protected areas, which cover 8.61% of Haiti's land area and inland waters, and 1.47% of Haiti's marine and coastal area.

National parks

Natural national parks
 Etang de Miragone Natural National Park
 Fort Royal Natural National Park
 Lac Azueï Natural National Park
 Source Royer Natural National Park
 Trois Etangs Natural National Park
 Soucailles Natural National Park
 Source Zabeth Natural National Park

Exceptional natural elements
 Grotte Marie Jeanne Exceptional Natural Element

Marine protected areas
Marine protected areas in Haiti are largely created through the efforts of the Foundation for the Protection of Marine Biodiversity (FoProBiM) and Reef Check Haiti to help protect Haiti's coastal and marine ecosystems. In August 2013, the Port Salut/Aquin Protected Area (Aire Protégée de Ressources Naturelles Gérées de Port Salut/Aquin), was created in Southwestern Haiti. Three Bays Protected Area (Aire Protégée de Ressources Naturelles Gérées des Trois Baies), located in northeastern Haiti, was created in December 2013.

Managed natural resources protected areas
Haiti has three marine/coastal managed natural resources protected areas:
 Baradéres-Cayemites Managed Natural Resources Protected Area
 Jérémie-Abricots Managed Natural Resources Protected Area
 Port Salut-Aquin Managed Natural Resources Protected Area

Other marine protected areas
Current list of marine protected areas in Haiti:
 Abacou 
 Complexe Cap-Camp Louise 
 Cote Belle Anse et Grand Gosier 
 Dame Marie 
 La Cahouane
 La Navase 
 Parc Marin de la Baie de l’Acul Marine Park 
 Parc Marin des Arcadins Marine Park
 Parc Marin des Rochelois Marine Park 
 Aire Protégée de Ressources Naturelles Gérées des Trois Baies (Three Bays Protected Area)
 Parc Marin Gonaïves/Grande Saline Marine Park
 Parc Marin Île-à-Vaches/Aquin Marine Park
 Parc Marin la Gonâve-Nord Marine Park
 Parc Marin la Gonâve-Sud Marine Park 
 Petit Paradis 
 Presqu'ile du Môle-Saint-Nicolas

See also

 List of World Heritage Sites in Haiti
 Environmental issues in Haiti
 Haiti National Trust
 Société Audubon Haïti

References

 List
Haiti
Protected areas
Parks in Haiti
 
Protected areas